Juhász or Juhás is a Hungarian family name meaning 'shepherd', which is usually anglicized to Yuhas. Notable people with the name include:

Juhász or Juhás

A 
 Ádám Juhász (born 1996), Hungarian handballer
 Adrián Juhász (born 1989), Hungarian rower
 Attila Juhász (born 1967), Hungarian politician

B 
 Béla Juhász (1921–2002), Hungarian long-distance runner

D 
 Dániel Juhász (born 1992), Hungarian football player

E 
 Eszter Juhász (born 1988), Finnish curler, born in Hungary

F 
 Ferenc Juhász (poet) (1928–2015), Hungarian poet
 Ferenc Juhász (politician) (born 1960), Minister of Defense for Hungary from 2002 to 2006

G 
 Gábor Juhász (born 1963), Hungarian politician
 Gabriella Juhász (born 1985), Hungarian handballer
 Gusztáv Juhász (1911–2003), Romanian footballer and coach
 Gyula Juhász (poet) (1883–1937), Hungarian poet
 Gyula Juhász (sculptor) (1876–1913), Hungarian sculptor and medallist
 Gyula Juhász (historian) (1930–1993), Hungarian historian

H 
 Hajnalka Juhász (born 1980), Hungarian lawyer and political scientist

I 
 Ildikó Juhász (born 1953), Hungarian hospitality worker and lesbian activist
 István Juhász (boxer) (born 1931), Hungarian boxer
 István Juhász (mathematician) (born 1943), Hungarian mathematician
 István Juhász (footballer) (born 1945), Hungarian football midfielder

J 
 József Juhász (1908–1974), Hungarian stage and film actor

K 
 Katalin Juhász (born 1932), Hungarian foil fencer

M 
 Marián Juhás (born 1979), Slovak footballer
 Miloš Juhász (born 1984), Slovak football midfielder
 Mónika Juhász Miczura (born 1972), Hungarian singer

P 
 Péter Juhász (born 1948), Hungarian football defender
 Péter Melius Juhász (1532–1572), Hungarian botanist, writer, theologian, Calvinist bishop

R 
 Roland Juhász (born 1983), Hungarian footballer

S 
 Sándor Juhász Nagy (1883–1946), Hungarian politician

V 
 Vanda Juhász (born 1989), Hungarian javelin thrower

Juhas 

 Mary C. Juhas (born 1955), American engineer working in materials science

Yuhas 

 John Edward "Eddie" Yuhas (1924–1986), American baseball pitcher
 Joseph Yuhas (born 1956), American politician
 Steve Yuhas (born 1973), American conservative radio personality

Hungarian-language surnames
Occupational surnames